43 Alumni for Biden is a Super PAC created by administration and campaign officials of the 43rd US president George W. Bush with a mission to mobilize Republican voters for the 2020 US Democratic presidential candidate, Joe Biden.

The advertising includes positive portrayals of Biden in swing states such as Pennsylvania, Wisconsin, Michigan, Florida, and Ohio. The PAC has over 360 members, including former cabinet members and senior officials.

The group releases videos from former officials in support of Joe Biden. The group had been in contact with the Joe Biden 2020 presidential campaign, but has no direct affiliation with former president George W. Bush.

Because it was formed a day after the June 30 deadline that would have required disclosure of its donors in mid-July, the group would not have to make the disclosure until mid-October, less than three weeks before the election. They raised $96,234 during the 2020 election cycle.

After Biden was elected, its name changed into 43 Alumni for America (43A4A).

See also
 Never Trump movement
 The Lincoln Project
 List of former Trump administration officials who endorsed Joe Biden
 List of Republicans who opposed the Donald Trump 2016 presidential campaign
 List of Republicans who opposed the Donald Trump 2020 presidential campaign
 REPAIR
 Republican Voters Against Trump
Right Side PAC

References 

Joe Biden 2020 presidential campaign
United States political action committees
Never Trump movement